A museum shop or museum store is a gift shop in a museum. Typical offerings include reproductions of works in the museum, picture postcards, books related to the museum's collections, and various kinds of souvenirs. Art museums often include clothing and decorative objects inspired by or copying artwork. Museum shops are often placed near the entrance or the exit. Temporary special exhibitions often have their own gift shops. Museum shops are often important sources of revenue for museums as public funding diminishes, and museum professionals often consider them as important elements of visitor education.

In the United States, museum shops developed after the Second World War. At first, they were often small and not professionally managed. They became important revenue generators in the 1980s. 

Museum shops have become an important element of visitors' perceptions of museums. Indeed, some studies show that visitors spend more time at the shop, the café, and so on, than with the exhibits.

Some writers on museums take an anti-commercialization position and criticize shops as undermining the cultural value of the museum.

References

Bibliography
 

Shop
Retail formats